Streaming XML is a synonym for dynamic data in XML format.

Another popular use of this term refers to one method of consuming XML data – largely known as Simple API for XML. This is via asynchronous events that are generated as the XML data is parsed. In this context, the consumer streams through the XML data one item at a time. It does not have anything to do whether the underlying data is being updated via dynamic or static means.

Uses 
 Extensible Messaging and Presence Protocol (XMPP). This is the protocol used for example in Google Talk.
 QuiXProc is an open source Java version of XProc which is streaming and doing parallel processing
 QuiXPath is an open source Java version of XPath which is streaming 
 QuiXSchematron is a java version of Schematron which is streaming, developed by INRIA/Innovimax

XSLT 3.0 
XSLT 3.0 is adding streaming as one of its capabilities

References 

XML